Jayyl (called Kalinin District until May 1993) is a district of Chüy Region in northern Kyrgyzstan. The administrative seat lies at Kara-Balta. It also administers an exclave in the southwestern heel of Chüy Region (the Suusamyr Valley, not on map at right), separated from the rest of the Jayyl District by the Panfilov District.

Population

Populated places
In total, Jayyl District include 1 town and 36 settlements in 12 rural communities. Each rural community can consist of one or several villages. The rural communities and settlements in the Jayyl District are:

 town Kara-Balta (town of district significance)
 Ak-Bashat (seat: Novonikolayevka; incl. Aydarbek, Ak-Bashat and Aral)
 Jayyl (seat: Alekseyevka; incl. Jayyl)
 Kara-Suu (seat: Stavropolovka; incl. Kara-Suu)
 Krasnovostochny (seat: Kalinin; incl. Kaldyk and Kara-Döbö)
 Kyzyl-Dyykan (seat: Petropavlovka; incl. Kyzyl-Dyykan)
 Poltavka (seat: Poltavka; incl. Orto-Suu and Mal-Tabar)
 Sary-Bulak (seat: Sary-Bulak; incl. Mongoldor)
 Sary-Koo (seat: Eriktuu; incl. Altyn, Jeken, Jon-Aryk, Iyri-Suu and Fedorovka)
 Sosnovka (seat: Sosnovka)
 Stepnoye (seat: Stepnoye)
 Suusamyr (seat: Suusamyr; incl. Kaysar, Birinchi May, Tunuk, Kojomkul, Karakol and Kyzyl-Oy)
 Taldy-Bulak (seat: Böksö-Jol; incl. Kayyrma and Bekitay)

References 

Districts of Chüy Region